Albert Worrall (birth unknown – death unknown) was an English professional rugby league footballer who played in the 1920s and 1930s.

Playing career

International honours
Worrall won a cap for England while at Leigh in 1934 against Australia.

Career Records
Worrall holds Leigh's 'Most Career Appearances' record with 503-appearances between 1920 and 1938.

References

English rugby league players
England national rugby league team players
Leigh Leopards captains
Leigh Leopards players
Place of birth missing
Place of death missing
Rugby league props
Rugby league second-rows
Year of birth missing
Year of death missing